The  Indianapolis Colts season was the franchise's 61st season in the National Football League, the 30th in Indianapolis and the second season under head coach Chuck Pagano, who missed most of the 2012 season due to treatment for leukemia. The Colts matched their 2012 record of 11–5, and went undefeated within the division during the season. The Colts hoped to advance further than the Wild Card round in the playoffs than in 2012, where they lost to the eventual Super Bowl champion Ravens. They did so after overcoming a 28-point deficit to the Chiefs in the opening round, coming back to win 45–44. However, the Colts were defeated by the New England Patriots in the Divisional round, by a score of 43–22.

On March 7, 2013, Jeff Saturday signed a one-day contract in order to retire as a member of the Indianapolis Colts.

For the second consecutive season, the Colts held the final pick in the NFL Draft, number 254, which is famously known as Mr. Irrelevant. In 2012, the final player selected was Chandler Harnish. The 2013 season's Mr. Irrelevant was Justice Cunningham.

Throughout the season, the Colts wore a patch to recognize the 30th season since their move to Indianapolis.

On October 20, 2013, Peyton Manning made his first return to Indianapolis since being released by the Indianapolis Colts in March 2012 and signed by the Denver Broncos, a game in which commentator Al Michaels dubbed "the War of 1812" (referring to Peyton Manning's number of 18 and Colts quarterback Andrew Luck's number of 12). The Colts won the game 39–33.

While losing their Week 14 match-up against the Cincinnati Bengals, the Colts overall record as well as a 4–0 record within the division was enough to earn them their 15th division title after the Denver Broncos defeated the Tennessee Titans. The Colts became the first team of the 2013 season to win their division, securing a home playoff game.

With the Titans' loss to the Cardinals in Week 15, the Colts were the only AFC South team to make the playoffs.

In the AFC wild card game against the Kansas City Chiefs, the Colts rallied to turn a 38–10 Chiefs' lead into a 45–44 victory for the third largest comeback in NFL playoff history. It is behind the Bills who rallied from a 32-point deficit in the 1993 AFC Wild Card Game and the Vikings who rallied from a 33-point deficit in 2022. As of 2022, this represents the most recent season where the Colts won their opening game.

2013 NFL draft

Notes
 The team traded its second-round selection (No. 54 overall) to the Miami Dolphins in exchange for cornerback Vontae Davis.
 The team traded its original fifth-round selection (No. 157 overall) along with a 2012 fourth-round selection to the San Francisco 49ers in exchange for the 49ers' 2012 third-round selection.
 The team acquired a new fifth-round selection (No. 139 overall) in a trade that sent its 2014 fourth-round selection to the Cleveland Browns.
 Selection No. 254 is a compensatory selection.

Undrafted free agents

Departures

Additions

Team captains

Note
 Team captains had not been selected, or at least, players selected as captains did not begin to display their signature "C-patch" on their jerseys until during their Week 15 match-up against Houston.  This just so happened to be the week that followed the Colts securing the AFC South title and their 26th playoff berth in franchise history.

Staff

Final roster

Schedule

Preseason

Regular season
For the first time since the 2002 season, the Colts did not play the New England Patriots during the regular season. The Colts–Patriots rivalry had become one of the most known in modern era sports. However, they did play each other in playoffs.

One highlight of the 2013 Colts season was a trip to San Francisco to play the 49ers. This game marked the return of starting quarterback Andrew Luck to the San Francisco Bay Area, where he played three seasons of college football at Stanford University, which for his first two years there was coached by Jim Harbaugh, then-coach of the 49ers. Luck got the better of his old coach with a 27–7 statement victory.

Note: Intra-division opponents are in bold text.

Game summaries

Regular season

Week 1: vs. Oakland Raiders

The Colts began their 2013 season at home, for the first time since 2009, against the Oakland Raiders.  The Raiders, who received the opening kickoff, would turn the ball over on a Terrelle Pryor interception by Colts cornerback Greg Toler.  The interception would allow Andrew Luck and the Colts offense to drive down the field and score the first touchdown of the season on a pass from Luck to Reggie Wayne.  Heading into the second quarter, the Colts defense would continue to prevent the Raiders from scoring, forcing Oakland to punt on second drive of the game.  Luck would again lead the Colts down the field in an eight play, 69-yard drive that would result in a touchdown pass from Luck to tight end Dwayne Allen, giving the Colts an early 14–0 lead.  Pryor and the Raiders would respond for the first time on their next offensive drive, which ended in a touchdown run from Darren McFadden.  Defensive stops by both the Colts and the Raiders would ensure no further scoring in the half and would allow Indianapolis to head into halftime with the 14–7 lead.  Indianapolis was forced to punt on their first offensive possession of the second half, while the Raiders would drive down to the Colts 20-yard line and would score on a Sebastian Janikowski field goal, cutting the Colts lead to 14–10 lead.  The Raiders would again begin to drive down the field and would score the go ahead touchdown early in the fourth quarter on a pass from Denarius Moore from Terrelle Pryor, giving the Raiders a 17–14 lead.  Andrew Luck, on the next Colts offensive drive, would lead the team down the field, 71 yards in 11 plays, with Luck himself scoring the game-winning touchdown on a 19-yard run.  Pryor and the Raiders would drive down to the Colts 24-yard line, though the drive would end with an interception by Antoine Bethea, sealing the Colts victory.

With the win, the Colts went to 1–0 on the season and extended their home winning streak to seven games.

Week 2: vs. Miami Dolphins

The Colts faced the Miami Dolphins in week two, a rematch of the 23–20 Colts victory during the 2012 season.  This game also marked the second meeting between Andrew Luck of the Colts and Ryan Tannehill of the Dolphins, both sophomore quarterbacks.  Indianapolis, who received the opening kickoff, were unable to score on their first drive, unlike the Dolphins who drove down 58 yards in six plays, while scoring on a Tannehill pass to wide receiver Mike Wallace, giving the Dolphins an early 7–0 lead.  The Colts would respond with a long drive of their own, however they would be able to put it into the endzone, settling instead for an Adam Vinatieri field goal.  The Dolphins would strike again, this time scoring in just two plays following a Tannehill 67-yard pass and a Lamar Miller touchdown run.  The Colts, who entered the second quarter trailing 14–3, quickly scored their first touchdown on the day with an Andrew Luck pass to tight end Coby Fleener.  After trading possessions, the Indianapolis offense would strike again, scoring their second touchdown of the quarter and taking the first lead of the day, though it would be taken away by a Caleb Sturgis field goal to end the half, with the teams going into halftime tied at 17.  Indianapolis would drive down on their first possession of the second half, though a touchdown would be nullified by an illegal shift penalty and forcing the Colts to settle for a field goal.  Midway through the third quarter, the Dolphins would score the go ahead touchdown on a Charles Clay run, putting them ahead 24–20.  On their last offensive possession of the day, Luck and the Colts would drive down to the Miami 23-yard line, though the comeback would fall short following a sack of Luck on fourth down.

With the loss, the Colts went to 1–1 on the season and lost their first home game since September 23, 2012.

Week 3: at San Francisco 49ers

Week 4: at Jacksonville Jaguars

Week 5: vs. Seattle Seahawks

Week 6: at San Diego Chargers

Week 7: vs. Denver Broncos

Week 9: at Houston Texans

The Colts fell behind 21–3 before rallying to defeat the Houston Texans on Sunday Night Football 27–24.

Week 10: vs. St. Louis Rams

Week 11: at Tennessee Titans

Week 12: at Arizona Cardinals

Week 13: vs. Tennessee Titans

Week 14: at Cincinnati Bengals

With the loss, the Colts dropped to 8–5, however, they clinched the AFC South division title after the Broncos defeated the Titans later in the evening.

Week 15: vs. Houston Texans

With the win, the Colts improved to 9–5 and 12–0 at home against the Texans.

Week 16: at Kansas City Chiefs

Week 17: vs. Jacksonville Jaguars

With the win, the Colts were the only team during the 2013 season to sweep all of their division rivals.

Standings

Division

Conference

Postseason

AFC Wild Card Playoff Game: vs. #5 Kansas City Chiefs

AFC Divisional Playoff Game: at #2 New England Patriots

References

External links
 

Indianapolis
Indianapolis Colts seasons
2013 in sports in Indiana
AFC South championship seasons